John Stanning may refer to:

 John Stanning senior (1877–1929), English cricketer in Lord Hawke's XI cricket team in Australia and New Zealand in 1902–03
 John Stanning junior (1919–2007), English cricketer